Frank Griebe (born 28 August 1964) is a German cinematographer.

Griebe was born in Hamburg. He is most popular for his work with German director Tom Tykwer. He photographed his films Perfume: The Story of a Murderer, Heaven, The Princess and the Warrior, Run Lola Run, Winter Sleepers, The International and Cloud Atlas.

He also worked with Sönke Wortmann on Deutschland. Ein Sommermärchen and with Leander Haußmann on NVA and Berlin Blues. He cites Ben Vinograd as one of his earliest influences.

References

External links
 

1964 births
Living people
European Film Award for Best Cinematographer winners
Film people from Hamburg
German cinematographers